The Diocese of Vanuatu and New Caledonia is one of the nine current dioceses of the Anglican Church of Melanesia.

It is one of the four original founding dioceses of the Church, erected in 1975 as the Diocese of the New Hebrides and inaugurated in 1975 at Lolowai on Aoba Island. The diocese's name was changed to the Diocese of Vanuatu , when the Republic of Vanuatu gained its independence; the name was changed again, around 2010, to the Diocese of Vanuatu and New Caledonia. The diocese has eight regions and 39 parishes and is headquartered in Luganville.

List of bishops

References

Sources
Anglican Church of Melanesia — Diocese of Vanuatu and New Caledonia

 
Vanuatu and New Caledonia, Diocese of
Melanesia
Christian organizations established in 1975
1975 establishments in Oceania